Evans Ridge is a broad ridge that trends in a north–south direction for about , standing between Midway Glacier and McKellar Glacier in the Victory Mountains of Victoria Land. It was mapped by the United States Geological Survey from surveys and U.S. Navy air photos, 1960–64, and was named in 1966 by the Advisory Committee on Antarctic Names for Arthur Evans, Secretary of the New Zealand Antarctic Place-Names Committee.

References 

Ridges of Victoria Land
Borchgrevink Coast